There are some rivers in Iceland named Hvítá (= engl. White river).

The most important ones are: 

Hvítá (Árnessýsla) in the south of Iceland 
and
Hvítá (Vesturland) in the west of the country (Vesturland) with the waterfalls Barnafoss and Hraunfossar.